Blerta Kaqiu (born 24 February 1992) is a Kosovar footballer who plays as a midfielder and has appeared for the Kosovo women's national team.

Career
Kaqiu has been capped for the Kosovo national team, appearing for the team during the 2019 FIFA Women's World Cup qualifying cycle.

See also
List of Kosovo women's international footballers

References

External links
 
 
 

1992 births
Living people
Kosovan women's footballers
Kosovo women's international footballers
Women's association football midfielders